Edmond Van Moer (born 21 July 1875) was a Belgian archer and Olympic champion. He competed at the 1920 Summer Olympics in Antwerp, where he won an individual gold medal in fixed target (small birds), and also two gold medals with the Belgian team.

References

1875 births
Belgian male archers
Olympic archers of Belgium
Archers at the 1920 Summer Olympics
Olympic gold medalists for Belgium
Year of death missing
Olympic medalists in archery
Medalists at the 1920 Summer Olympics